Point Lynas Lighthouse is located on a headland in Llaneilian Community, on the north-east corner of Anglesey in North Wales (at ). A pilot station was established on the point in 1766, to guide ships entering and leaving Liverpool, with an associated lighthouse added in 1779. The present building was built on the hilltop in 1835, so does not need a tower. Built and managed by the Mersey Docks and Harbour Board, it did not come under the care of Trinity House until 1973. By 2001 the lights were fully automated, so no resident staff were needed. Whilst the light is retained in operational use, the building and associated lighthouse keepers cottages were returned to the Mersey Docks and Harbour Board who sold them to be a private home and holiday accommodation.

History
This unusual and distinctive lighthouse was designed by Jesse Hartley, engineer to the Mersey Docks and Harbour Board from 1824 to 1860, but with additions by G Lyster some twenty years later.

The semicircular lantern is located at the base. The lantern is topped by a plain conical roof with a ball finial. The square tower above has a corbelled oriel window of the pilot's look-out.

Original location

The lantern

The unusual arrangement of having the lantern at ground level with the look-out and telegraph room above is similar to the Great Orme Lighthouse, also built by the Mersey Docks and Harbour Board. The telegraph station was established in 1879, and two new cottages were erected to accommodate extra staff. Point Lynas has now been taken over by Trinity House.

A Chance Brothers occulting optic was fitted in the light room in 1878. The bottom unit is made up of six bands of reflective prisms, while the inclined top unit contains sixteen.

The lamp has an intensity of 89,900 candela and is white, occulting every 10 seconds.

Electrification and automation
In 1952 the station was electrified and the mechanical elements of the original light-shutter were removed. In 1948 an automatic acetylene fog-gun was installed, but was removed in 1973, when the light was transferred to Trinity House, who fitted electrical emitters. The light was automated in 1989 and is now controlled from Holyhead. As a result, the lighthouse keepers' cottages reverted to Mersey Docks and Harbour Company, who subsequently sold it to be a private family home, with the lighthouse keepers' cottages turned into holiday lets.

Historical importance
The lighthouse is considered to be important for its association with Jesse Hartley (1780–1860), the engineer responsible for the world's first great floating dock system at Liverpool

See also

 List of lighthouses in Wales

References

Sources
 Hague, D., B., The Lighthouses of Wales Their Architecture and Archaeology (The Royal Commission on the Ancient and Historical Monuments of Wales, Edited by Hughes, S., 1994)

External links

 Trinity House

Lighthouses completed in 1874
Lighthouses in Anglesey
Llaneilian
1874 establishments in the United Kingdom
Grade II listed lighthouses
Grade II listed buildings in Anglesey